Berlin Pancho Auchumeb (born 9 January 1974) is a former National and international footballer, also formally with Chief Santos of the Namibia Premier League. Was also contracted to South African football giants Jomo Cosmos FC. Highlight of his career being, the day he played in a friendly match alongside Jomo Cosmos' boss Jomo Sono, in Port Elizabeth, in a friendly match against Orlando Pirates of SA (2001). And also the day he matched shoulder to shoulder at a Media tournament in Soweto JHB November 28, 2000, against one of the legends South Africa could produce, Marks Maponyane. He competed for the Namibia national football team from 1998–2004, with 27 caps, including the 1998 African Cup of Nations.  And Berlin Auchumeb was the hero with his stunning sudden-death extra-time winner against the giant nation of South Africa, Bafana Bafana in Windhoek (1998 Casafa Cup) preliminary game. Managing Director, of Tsumeb Emmanuel Rehab Centre in Tsumeb.

Honours, awards and recognitions 
Berlin Auchumeb was awarded with a Park renamed after him, in recognition towards nation building. Being a former national and international footballer.

References

1974 births
Living people
Namibia international footballers
Namibian men's footballers
1998 African Cup of Nations players
Chief Santos players

Association football forwards